Eugenija Pleškytė (6 January 1938 – 3 November 2012) was a Lithuanian actress.

In 2009, she was awarded the Special Golden Crane in Sidabrinė gervė awards by the Lithuanian Film Academy for her contributions to Lithuanian cinema.

References

External links

1938 births
2012 deaths
Lithuanian film actresses
Lithuanian stage actresses
Disease-related deaths in Lithuania